A tool-assisted speedrun or tool-assisted superplay (TAS ) is generally defined as a speedrun or playthrough composed of precise inputs recorded with tools such as video game emulators. During development of a TAS, the framerate is slowed down to allow precise inputs to be done with ease. Splicing, the action of adding inputs from other speedruns is also used. The goal of a TAS is to create a theoretically perfect playthrough. A TAS is created by a person who can use tools to perform impressive feats in a video game. The person creating such a run uses what they know about the game, what they learned from others, and what they discovered themselves to make their tool-assisted speedrun.

Tool-assisted speedruns are generally created with the goal of creating the perfect speedrun. This includes but is not limited to the best path to completing a game as fast as possible and/or showing a new way to optimize it. Some tools used by creators of a TAS (TASers) include savestates and branches, slow-down to frame-by-frame, rewriting recorded inputs, as well as creation of macros and scripts to perform automated actions. Most of these tools are used more than once throughout any given TAS. These give the creator of said speedrun the ability to perform with precision and accuracy beyond what a human can do.

The idea is not to make gameplay easier for players but rather to produce a playthrough at a level of gameplay impractical for a human player. Rather than being a branch of e-sports focused on practical achievements, tool-assisted speedrunning concerns itself with research into the theoretical limits of the games and their respective competitive categories. Tool-assisted speedruns are produced with an emphasis on entertainment value — such as including tricks and stunts that would otherwise be prohibitively difficult to incorporate. However, some authors may choose to lose time in order to produce a more entertaining movie since the fastest route to the intended goal may not be the most exciting.

History

1999–2001 
The term was coined during the early days of Doom speedrunning, during which the first of these runs were made (although they were sometimes also referred to as "built demos"). When Andy "Aurican" Kempling released a modified version of the Doom source code that made it possible to record demos in slow motion and in several sessions, it was possible for the first players to start recording tool-assisted demos. A couple of months afterwards, in June 1999, Esko Koskimaa, Peo Sjoblom and Joonatan Donner opened the first site to share these demos, "Tools-Assisted Speedruns".

Like many other tool-assisted speedrun communities, the maintainers of the site stressed the fact that their demos were for entertainment purposes rather than skill competitions, although the attempt to attain the fastest time possible with tools itself became a competition as well. The site became a success, updating usually several times a week with demos recorded by its maintainers and submitted by its readers. After a short while, when version 2.03 of Lee Killough's Marine's Best Friend Doom source port was released (based on the Boom source port), it became even easier for people to record these demos, adding the functionality of re-recording without having to replay the demo until it reached the point where the player wanted to continue.

The site was active until August 10, 2001, when Jonathan Donner posted a news message stating that their site would be an archive from now on, and pointing towards The Doomed Speed Demos Archive, a site mainly for non-assisted speedruns, of which the author agreed to take over the posting of tool-assisted speedruns. Although popularity dwindled since then, built demos have still been submitted as late as November 2005, and are usually made with PrBoom.

2003–present 
In 2003, a video of a Japanese player named Morimoto completing the NES game Super Mario Bros. 3 in 11 minutes and performing stunts started floating around the Internet. The video proved to be controversial, as not many people knew about tool-assisted speedruns at the time, especially for the NES. As the video was not clearly labelled as such, many people felt they had been cheated when they found out it was done using an emulator. The video, however, inspired Joel "Bisqwit" Yliluoma to start a website called NESvideos, which was dedicated to tool-assisted speedruns for the NES. At first it hosted videos only for the NES, but as the community grew, its members added the features required for tool-assisted speedrunning into emulators for other systems. The name of the site was later changed to TASVideos.

As of May 2020, TASVideos is the largest English-language web community that produces and hosts tool-assisted speedruns; the site holds 4161 complete speedruns, of which 2213 are the fastest of their kind.

Tool-assisted speedruns have been made for some notable ROM hacks as well as for published games. In 2014 a speedrunning robot, TASBot, was developed, capable of performing TAS runs via direct controller input.

A joke personification of tool-assisted speedruns, called TAS-san (TASさん, lit. Mr. TAS), has become popular among Japanese Internet users. Tool-assisted speedruns uploaded to sites like Nico Nico Douga, YouTube, or TASVideos may be described as a new world record by TAS-san, who is said to have the superhuman memory and reflexes needed to execute such a speedrun in real time.

Method 

Creating a tool-assisted speedrun is the process of finding the optimal set of inputs to fulfill a given criterion — usually completing a game as fast as possible. No limits are imposed on the tools used for this search, but the result has to be a set of timed key-presses that, when played back on the actual console, achieves the target criterion. The basic method used to construct such a set of inputs is to record one's input while playing the game on an emulator, all the while saving and loading the emulator's state repeatedly to test out various possibilities and only keep the best result. To make this more precise, the game is slowed down. Initially, it was common to slow down to some low fraction (e.g. 5%) of normal speed. However, due to advances in the field, it is now expected that the game is paused during recording, with emulation advanced one frame at a time to eliminate any mistakes made due to the urgency.

The use of savestates also facilitates another common technique, luck manipulation, which is the practice of exploiting the game's use of player input in its pseudo-random number generation to make favorable outcomes happen. Using a savestate from before some event, it is possible to experiment with small input variations until the event has the desired outcome. Depending on the game and event, this can be a very time-consuming process, at times requiring much backtracking, and can as such take up a large portion of the total time spent making a tool-assisted speedrun. Examples of luck manipulation include making the ideal piece drop next in Tetris, or getting a rare item drop the first time one kills an enemy in an action game.

A rarely used tool is brute-force searching for ideal inputs by making a computer play the game, trying all possible inputs. In theory, this process could find the ideal set of inputs for any game, but since the space of all possible inputs grows exponentially with the length of the sequence, this is only viable for optimizing very small portions of the speed run. Instead, a heuristic algorithm can be used. Although such an approach does not guarantee a perfect solution, it can prove very effective for solving simple puzzle games.

Another rarely used technique is disassembling the game executable. By exposing the game logic, this enables the player to manipulate luck without trial and error, or reveal obscure bugs in the game engine. A more common, related technique, is to monitor the memory addresses responsible for certain effects to learn when or how they change. Memory watching is supported by most emulators used on TASVideos.org.

All these techniques involve direct interaction with the game state in ways not possible without emulation, but the final result, the set of inputs that makes up the speedrun, does not depend on such manipulation of the state of the emulated machine. The tool use in tool-assisted speedrunning is therefore different from the sort of state manipulation that tools like Gameshark provide, since such manipulation would not be expressible as a sequence of timed inputs.

Re-recording emulators 
Tool-assisted speedrunning relies on the same series of inputs being played back at different times always giving the same results. In a manner of speaking, the emulation must be deterministic with regard to the saved inputs (e.g. random seeds must not change from run to run). Otherwise, a speedrun that was optimal on one playback might not even complete it on a second playback. This loss of synchronization, or "desync", occurs when the state of the emulated machine at a particular time index no longer corresponds with that which existed at the same point in the movie's production. Desyncs can also be caused by incomplete savestates, which cause the emulated machine to be restored in a state different from that which existed when it was saved. Desyncs can also occur when a user attempts to match inputs from an input file downloaded from TASVideos and fail to match the correct enemy reactions due to bad AI or RNG.

Problems with emulation, such as nondeterminism and incomplete savestates, are often only discovered under the precise frame-by-frame conditions of tool-assisted speedrunning. Emulator developers often do not give speedrunning issues high priority because they have little effect on regular gameplay; consequentially the community has forked several emulators to make them suitable for the task. These include Snes9X improvement, Gens rerecording, VBA rerecording and Mupen rerecording. If a forked emulator is used to produce a TAS, playback on the normal, unmodified version of the emulator will usually result in a desync.

Emulators that currently feature the tools necessary to create tool-assisted speedruns include the Arcade emulator MAME (MAMEUI's option to record an uncompressed AVI slows down a game), the NES emulator FCEUX, the Super NES emulator Snes9x, the Genesis emulator Gens, the Game Boy Advance emulator VisualBoyAdvance, the Nintendo 64 emulator Mupen64, the GameCube and Wii emulator Dolphin, the Nintendo DS emulator DeSmuME, the Sega Saturn emulator Yabause, the PlayStation emulator PSXjin, and several others for these and other platforms.

In 2012, an all-in-one emulator, BizHawk, was released on TASVideos.org. Due to the success of some of the cores built into the emulator, the website's team opted to phase out the use of some older emulators, like FCEUX, Mupen64-rr and PSXjin, towards the end of the year.

Relation to unassisted runs 
Tool-assisted speedruns are timed in a distinct category from unassisted runs, for reasons of fairness. In unassisted runs, a difficult path is often avoided in favor of a safer, but slower one, in order to avoid risks such as dying and having to start over, failing a trick and wasting more time, or failing a setup for a difficult trick. Depending on the game, tool-assisted speedruns can surpass their unassisted counterparts by a few seconds to entire hours (with the major sources of time differences including TAS-only routes or tricks as well incremental advantages gained from frame-by-frame precision that add up over time). For an example of a highly optimized real-time run, the fastest TAS of the NTSC version of Super Mario Bros. currently stands at 4:57 (4:54.032 using standard unassisted timing), while the fastest unassisted run stands at 4:58 (4:54.798 using standard unassisted timing by Niftski).

Timing conventions 
Tool-assisted runs are timed by input, i.e. from game power-on to the last input necessary to reach the ending scene and/or the game credits. Any introductory cutscenes, game-loading screens, and trailing dialogues after the last boss battle (if input is necessary to scroll through the text) are included in the final times. The times are exact (to the nearest frame), a level of precision that is usually not possible with unassisted runs because it cannot be determined from a recording when exactly the input ended. Speed Demos Archive and Twin Galaxies measure only the length of the gameplay proper, and begin timing when the player gains control of the character and ends timing when the player loses it. These differences in timing conventions can result in seemingly discrepant times between unassisted and tool-assisted runs. For example, a Super Mario Bros. speedrun by Andrew Gardikis, a 4:58 by SDA timing, seems to be only 0.69 seconds slower than a TAS of 4 minutes and 57.31 seconds by HappyLee, but his run actually contains 5 minutes and 1 second of input starting from power-on.

Unassisted runs faster than their assisted counterparts 
Because tool-assisted speedruns often take more time to create than unassisted speedruns, discovery of a time-saving trick may lead to a situation of the fastest unassisted speedrun being faster than its tool-assisted counterpart.

From August 13 to 21, 2007, the fastest unassisted speedrun of Pokémon Blue was 4 minutes faster than the best TAS due to a new trick that allowed walking through walls. On August 21, however, a TAS was submitted that was 20 minutes faster than the unassisted run. 

From January 12, 2020, the fastest unassisted speedrun of Donkey Kong Country was 810 milliseconds faster than the best TAS due to a new trick that allowed Diddy Kong to grab a DK barrel and the throw the DK barrel near a hidden barrel at the beginning of the last level, which skips the entire last level and level-finish animation as well.

Some games may produce beneficial glitches if the inserted cartridge is manipulated, which may not be reproduced on an emulator for a TAS. One of the most famous examples is The Legend of Zelda: Ocarina of Time, where lifting the side of the cartridge may allow the player to walk through solid walls. 

However, due to potential benefits for either kind of speedrunning, it is not uncommon for speedrunners of both types to collaborate. Unassisted speedrunners can provide their expertise on the subject and receive new points of reference in return. A number of unassisted speedrunners have also made complete TASes, and vice versa.

Degree of glitch use 
One of the most important differences between a tool-assisted and unassisted run is the use of glitches in the game. Though glitch use is often prevalent in unassisted runs, tool-assisted speedruns often make much heavier use of them. This may in part be because the majority of glitches are very difficult to exploit without frame precision and re-recording. In some cases, a trick relies not only on precise timing but also on several variables in memory having a specific state, which would be nearly impossible to recreate in real-time and without detailed knowledge of the game program.

Entertainment factor 
These differences also lead to different expectations from tool-assisted and unassisted speedruns. Taking damage when doing so does not save time and/or is not required may look sloppy in a tool-assisted run, while being hit by the occasional hard-to-avoid enemy in a relatively long unassisted speedrun would not prevent the runner from holding their world record title. After the advent of frame-advance, frame-precise movement has also come to be expected, the lack of which may be characterized as sloppy play. Another difference is in the standards of use of waiting time in the speedrun: in situations where it is not possible to make the game move faster, and the player has to wait, such as in autoscrolling or any other areas of a game in which the runner does not have control over the speed, the runner is advised in TASVideos guidelines to do something entertaining for the viewers. An example of this is the gathering of 99 extra lives in the autoscrolling sections of the famous Super Mario Bros. 3 speedrun. In unassisted runs, players usually would not risk dying and having to start over to entertain the viewer.

Runs that prove unentertaining may get rejected for publication, even if the run itself is technically optimized. A bad game choice may contribute to a lack of entertainment. In this context, a "bad game" may represent a goal choice that does not demonstrate the merits of tool assistance, so choosing a different goal may alleviate this issue. In other cases, such as the Excitebike TAS by Thomas Seufert, a previously unpopular game had achieved a notable entertainment boost due to massive improvements brought into play by increased tool-assisted precision.

When someone submits a finished movie file of their input data for publication on the TASvideos website, the audience will vote on if they find the movie entertaining or not. According to their website, movies that stick with their site rules and have an 80% Yes Vote rate is a sign to say that the audience is interested in the movie and is more likely to be accepted or replace the currently published movie and have the newer movie published on their website.

Verification of unassisted speedruns
Some players have fraudulently recorded speedruns, either by creating montages of other speedrun or altering the playing time, posting them as TAS or RTA. Because tool assisted speedruns can account for all aspects of the game code, including its inner workings, and press buttons precisely and accurately, they can be used to help verify whether an unassisted speedrun record is legitimate.

 One of the best-known cases is Billy Mitchell, who had his Donkey Kong and Pac-Man Guinness records revoked in 2018, considering that he used an emulator.
 In 2018, the world record for Dragster by Todd Rogers was removed from Twin Galaxies and Guinness records after an experiment showed that his 5.51 second time was impossible to achieve even with a TAS.
 Another fraudulent RTA case is from Badabun, where Tavo Betancourt streamed a Super Mario Bros. speedrun, finishing it at 05:12'120. Later, it was discovered that he was only pretending to play a series of speedruns from other YouTubers. The stream has been parodied by several YouTubers of the genre, including Kosmic, former world recorder holder for Super Mario Bros..

Notable speedruns 

 Super Mario Bros.: Current world record, created by HappyLee at 4:57.31 using warp pipes.
Celeste: Exploitation of the game's conservation-of-momentum mechanic along with other advanced movement techniques like spikejumps and demodashes allow the base game to be completed in under 22 minutes and Chapter 8's C-Side to be completed in 18.003.
 Pokémon Red: The save glitch allows finishing the game in 0:00 according to the in-game timer, and in 01:09.95 according to the TAS timer.
 Pokémon Yellow: Arbitrary code execution allows multiple games (non-playable, basically video sequences) to be injected "into" Pokémon Yellow, such as Pokémon Gold, Tetris, Super Mario Bros. Deluxe, among others, in addition to injecting Portals ending song, and an excerpt from a scene from SpongeBob SquarePants in FMV format.
 Super Mario Bros. 3: Arbitrary code execution along with credits glitch allows injecting a hack that simulates a Unix-like console, providing extra features to Mario.
 Super Mario World:
 Credits glitch, run by several players since 2011 using emulators, and by SethBling in 2015 on a real console.
 Arbitrary code execution allows to inject playable versions of Flappy Bird, Pong, Snake, and Super Mario Bros.
 Super Mario 64: Finishing the game with 0 stars is possible by utilizing several "backwards long jumps" to bypass locked doors with considerable backward momentum. The "0 Star" speedrun has been completed in 6:31.520 by KANNO, which is the current RTA (Real-Time Attack) world record. The current TAS world record is 4:15.78 (N64 Console Timing). This TAS performs a complex sequence break called "Moat Door Skip". This trick uses precise movement to open an underwater door in the moat outside the castle, which allows the first Bowser fight to be skipped. Another notable use of TAS in Super Mario 64 is in the "A Button Challenge", in which a TAS is made to achieve some goal (typically either collecting a single star, or beating the entire game) while pressing the A button as few times as possible. This challenge, which was popularised by YouTuber pannenkoek2012, can currently collect all 120 stars and beat the game with only 14 A presses.
 Minecraft''': Minecraft TASes are often done by slowing down the game by a large amount so that a human can input frame-perfect controls consistently. The current world record for this is by TASer DylanDC14, who beat the game on a “set seed” (predetermined world generation seed) in 19.9 seconds.

 Glossary 

In the context of tool-assisted speedrunning, many common terms, usually neologisms, have been created. These terms are necessary to understand most general discussions about the phenomenon. This list covers the most ubiquitous terminology. Note that some words may have a different typical meaning outside of the lexicon of tool-assisted speedrunning; for example, frame applies to movies as well as to video games, but only the latter has relevance in this case.

Arbitrary Code Execution
A type of exploit of a game's memory that allows the user to inject code into it using controller inputs. This type of glitch can force the game to end immediately by warping the player to the end of the game itself; another common use is to generate another game or type of program inside the game being run. A notable example of this is a run of Super Mario World during which Snake and Pong were injected into Super Mario World.
Category
A particular intention or set of rules with which to record a speedrun, such as playing with different characters, collecting all items or achieving the best ending. Sometimes, when a glitch is found that allows extremely fast completion of a game, it will be considered a separate "category" as people may find the old way of doing it to be more enjoyable or otherwise interesting.The most common categories include any% (fastest completion), 100% (full completion — may differ on per-game basis), and low% (completion using the minimum amount of items or powerups; sometimes synonymous with any%).
Emulator
Software which allows video games for consoles or older computers to run on modern platforms (computer architecture and/or operating system) and provides the runner with the common toolset, such as savestates. Emulators that currently feature the tools necessary to create tool-assisted speedruns include the NES emulators FCE Ultra, FCEUX, Famtasia, Nintendulator and VirtuaNES, the Super NES emulators Snes9x and ZSNES, the Master System emulators vbsms+ and Dega, the Genesis emulator Gens, the Game Boy Advance emulator VisualBoyAdvance, the Nintendo 64 emulator Mupen64, the Arcade emulator FinalBurn Alpha, and the Nintendo DS emulator DeSmuME.
Input
The data that is inserted into the game, either by the actions of a player (both during normal play and during speedrunning) or by an input file. The data can, for example, represent button presses/releases and joystick positions (e.g. with the Nintendo 64) on the controller, and even the reset button of the console if the emulator's input file format records these events.
Input file
A computer file that, among various other data, contains the analog or digital states of all buttons during every frame of a tool-assisted speedrun movie. This data is needed to reconstruct actions in a game, using an emulator. It may also contain a save state that is loaded at the beginning of the movie unless the movie starts from console power-on or reset (as is the case with most movies on the TASVideos website).
Frame
One of the still images composing the animation of a video game. Most gaming systems (and thus, emulators) update the screen approximately 50 (PAL) or 60 (NTSC) times per second (although sometimes only every second or third frame is rendered on some systems, lag notwithstanding). Every update is called a frame. Almost all console systems check the input (which buttons are pressed on the controller) once per frame, which is therefore the highest possible resolution of input in tool-assisted speedrunning.
Frame advance
An emulation feature which allows for the manual progression of frames by pressing a button. It is similar to slow motion; however, the game is effectively paused until the player decides to resume the emulation for one frame. This is used in order to create input at exactly a specific time, seen as how one can find a particular moment simply by checking every frame at one's leisure.
Glitch
An unintentional feature in a game — usually considered an error. Many games contain glitches, some very small and hardly notable but others very significant. Glitches are often the result of accidental or intentional sloppy programming. Because many console games are run on rather slow CPU power, perfect programming (such as pixel-perfect collision checks) would often be too slow. As a result, programming “shortcuts” have to be taken.
Hex editing, Binary editing
The act of editing the raw data that composes a binary file (usually done with a tool that displays the file data in hexadecimal numbers, hence the name hex editing). This is usually done in order to modify input files, such as to change small errors or to copy and paste parts of a movie. Due to its difficulty, it is fairly scarcely done.
Lag
The effect experienced when the game runs slower than its normal speed due to an excess of instructions for the CPU to calculate in the time of one frame. Thus, the CPU will spread the calculations over multiple frames. Because it cannot show the results of the calculations when expected, there will be identically rendered frames while it is working. Often, during lag, the game will ignore the player's input until the calculations are finished. There might also appear graphical anomalies, such as Head-Up Displays appearing in the wrong place. Note that lag often refers to delays experienced in computing communications, such as during online gaming.
Luck manipulation, RNG manipulation
The act of recording a beneficial pseudo-randomly generated result. All gaming systems are fundamentally computers, which can only perform predetermined calculations; thus all "random" numbers must inherently be generated from predictable but hard-to-replicate sources such as frame counts, timers, and input sequences. Such sources are difficult for a real-time player to control, but when the aim is to simply generate an input sequence that yields a desired result, the creator of said input sequence can attempt different methods of input to see how a game will react, and then keep the input sequence that performs best. Frame advance and savestates are the most common way to quickly examine multiple attempts. Common results that rely on pseudo-randomly generated numbers in the context of video games include instances of artificial intelligence or the obtaining of random power-ups.
Re-recording
A feature in TAS-oriented emulators that allows movie recording to resume after loading a savestate, usually from a point in time before the current state in order to test other input sequences.
ROM
The read-only memory of a game cartridge dumped as a binary file on a separate file storage medium. It contains all data of a game cartridge, such as the programming as well as the graphics and music. Loading a ROM image of a game in an emulator is the usual method to play such games.
Savestate
A snapshot of the emulated system's state at that current moment. Restoring a saved savestate will revert the console and the game to that exact state, including the game's future outcomes of pseudo-random generators. This is known as a re-record when performed during the recording of a movie (input file).
Slow motion
The slowing down of an emulated system to make it easier to create input (thus increasing the potential precision). The usage of slow motion is crucial to tool-assisted speedrunning, as many of the esoteric techniques are impossible to perform without it due to mechanical and human limitations. Frame advance is the most accurate kind of slow motion.
TAS
Common abbreviation of tool-assisted speedrun. The word TAS is used in the tool-assisted speedrun community exactly like the word “speedrun” is used in the unassisted speedrun community. Since objectives of tool-assisted creations started deviating from only including fastest completions, the abbreviation is mutually used for tool-assisted superplay as well.
Timeattack
Tool-assisted speedruns are sometimes called "timeattack". This most likely stems from the Japanese term “タイムアタック” (“taimuatakku''”). In the English community, this term has mostly fallen out of favor; this term can also be seen in numerous games that have a lowest completion time mode (e.g. as opposed to "score-attack" mode, where the goal is highest score).

See also 

Time attack — a mode which allows the player to finish a game (or a part of it) as fast as possible, saving record times.
Score attack — the attempt to reach a record logged point value in a game.
Electronic sports — video games that are played as competitive sports.
Piano roll
Meta Runner — a web series inspired by the tool assisted speedruns.

Notes

References

External links 
 TASVideos – A site hosting tool-assisted speedruns and TAS-related resources

Video game gameplay
Speedrunning